Microcavia (mountain cavies) is a genus of rodents in the family Caviidae. They are unique within their family in that their premolar teeth do not grow and replace the original deciduous cheek teeth until after the animal is born; in other genera this occurs in the womb.

It contains six extant species:
 Southern mountain cavy, M. australis
Jayat's mountain cavy, M. jayat
Thomas's mountain cavy, M. maenas
 Andean mountain cavy, M. niata
 Shipton's mountain cavy, M. shiptoni
Sorojchi mountain cavy, M. sorojchi

At least nine fossil species have also been named, dating back to the mid Pliocene, although it is unclear how many of these are truly valid.

References

Cavies
Rodent genera
Taxa named by Paul Gervais
Taxa named by Florentino Ameghino
Taxonomy articles created by Polbot